Marino Contarini (died 1455) was a Roman Catholic prelate who served as Bishop of Treviso (1453–1455) and Bishop of Kotor (1430–1453).

Biography
On 10 July 1430, Marino Contarini was appointed during the papacy of Pope Martin V as Bishop of Kotor.
On 19 November 1453, he was appointed during the papacy of Pope Nicholas V as Bishop of Treviso.
He served as Bishop of Treviso until his death in 1455.

References

External links and additional sources
 (for Chronology of Bishops)
 (for Chronology of Bishops)
 (for Chronology of Bishops)
 (for Chronology of Bishops)

1455 deaths
Roman Catholic bishops of Kotor
Bishops appointed by Pope Martin V
Bishops appointed by Pope Nicholas V
Montenegrin Roman Catholic bishops
15th-century Italian Roman Catholic bishops